The Prince of Wales Range is a mountain range in the South West Wilderness, Tasmania, Australia.
It is situated north and parallel to the Denison River.  It lies to the west of Lake Gordon, and southeast of Frenchmans Cap.

It is considered a difficult range to traverse, and is particularly difficult to access.

The first known traverse of the range was by Reg Williams and Olegas Truchanas in 1963

Named peaks in the range include:
 Diamond Peak
 Olegas Bluff

Notes

See also

 List of mountain ranges of Tasmania

Mountain ranges of Tasmania
South West Tasmania